USS McCawley may refer to the following ships of the United States Navy:

 , a Clemson-class destroyer, commissioned in 1919 and decommissioned in 1930.
 , a transport commissioned in 1940 and later recommissioned as APA-4. She was sunk by a combination of enemy and friendly fire in 1943.

United States Navy ship names